Kaziranga National Park (Assamese: কাজিৰঙা ৰাষ্ট্ৰীয় উদ্যান Kazirônga Rastriyô Uddyan) is an Indian national park and a World Heritage Site in Golaghat and Nagaon districts of Assam, India. It is refuge for the world's largest population of Great One-horned Rhinoceros. Kaziranga has the highest density of tigers in the World. The park has many Elephant, Water Buffalo and Swamp Deer and is an Important Bird Area. The park has achieved notable progress in wildlife conservation despite several constraints.

Kaziranga is a vast stretch of tall elephant grass, marshland and dense tropical moist broadleaf forests crisscrossed by four main rivers—Brahmaputra, Diphlu, Mora Diphlu and Mora Dhansiri and has numerous small water bodies. Kaziranga has been the theme of several books, documentaries and songs.

Seasons
The park is flooded often by the Brahmaputra which is necessary for maintaining the biological balance of the park. It is not uncommon for the park to be flooded for 5–10 days at a time, and around three-quarters of the Western reaches of the park consisting of the Baguri area is annually submerged.

The park roughly experiences 3 seasons—summer, monsoon and winter. The hot and humid Monsoon season extends from June to September. During the monsoon, Kaziranga receives mean rainfall of  brought by the South West monsoon.

Seasonal variation

Seasonal variations in the vegetation and habitat of the animal is notable in the park. During winter the shallow Beels and nullahs (small water channel) dry up and the growth of short grasses cover up their beds. The grasses also grow around the perennial Beels. With the end of the monsoon season, herbivorous animals, especially the Rhinoceros rush in these areas for grazing.

In the other parts of the park the tall coarse grasses dry up by the month of December and January and are then control burnt by the park staff. After such burning some animals begin to concentrate in the burnt patches and relish the ash and the partially burnt stems of the reeds. With few winter showers fresh grass blades shoot up in the burnt patches attracting larger number of animals to these areas.

With the onset of the summer season the grasses in the burnt patches grow up quickly and the tender shoots turn into coarse blades, which no longer attract the animals. The temperature also goes up and the animals prefer to remain near the water sources especially around the numerous perennial beels and water streams inside the park.

During the monsoon, the shallow Beels and the nullahs start to get filled up, firstly by the monsoon showers and later by the floodwaters. The animals gradually start moving towards higher grounds, which are situated around the tree forests. When the flood water covers most of the areas the animals migrate to the nearby Karbi Anglong Hills and other adjoining areas.

Notes

Kaziranga National Park
Kaziranga